Telling Stories with Tomie dePaola is a 2001 children's television series produced by The Jim Henson Company.

Plot
This show is about Tomie dePaola and his squirrel sidekick Gabe who present stories revolving around his storybook characters.

Characters
 Tomie dePaola (Himself) - The main character of the series.
 Gabe the Squirrel (performed by John Kennedy) - A mischievous red squirrel who is Tomie's friend, confidant, and muse.
 The Animal Band - A group of woodland creatures that Gabe the Squirrel visits every episode. It consists of a rabbit on drums (performed by James Murray), a weasel on guitar (performed by Julianne Buescher), a raccoon on keytar (performed by John Kennedy), and a penguin on bass guitar (performed by Greg Ballora).
 Strega Nona (performed by Bill Barretta) - An elderly lady who always wants help from her friends Big Anthony and Bambolona.
 Big Anthony (performed by John Kennedy) - A tall dimwitted man who is one of Strega Nona's friends.
 Bambolona (performed by Julianne Buescher) - One of Strega Nona's friends. With Bambolona being a live-hand puppet, Julianne Buescher is assisted in performing her by James Murray who operates Bambolona's right hand.
 Goat (performed by James Murray) - An unnamed goat that appeared in the "Strega Nona" segments. He and Bambolona don't get along very well as Bambolona claims that it doesn't really help at all, but the goat is usually shown to have more intelligence than most of the characters. The character of "Goat" was based on the designs from Tomie dePaola's illustrated "Strega Nona" books. The design featured a departure from the traditional Muppet-look appearance as the goal was to match the water color illustrations found in the book. His puppet was built by James Wojtal working under the supervision of Rollie Krewson.

Episodes
 "Tales Around the Table" (August 6, 2001)
 "Where Do You Get Ideas?" (August 7, 2001)
 "What's a Story?" (August 8, 2001)
 "Stories For Myself" (August 9, 2001)
 "Food as Storytelling" (August 10, 2001)
 "That's a Story?!?" (August 13, 2001)
 "Getting Started" (August 14, 2001)
 "Character" (August 15, 2001)
 "Setting" (August 16, 2001)
 "Point of View" (August 17, 2001)
 "Performance of Storytelling" (August 20, 2001)
 "Every Picture Tells a Story" (August 21, 2001)
 "Making Sense of Our World Through Stories" (August 22, 2001)
 "Taking a Chance" (August 23, 2001)
 "Finding Your Audience" (August 24, 2001)
 "Funny" (August 27, 2001)
 "Scary" (August 28, 2001)
 "Moods: Happy/Sad" (August 29, 2001)
 "History" (August 30, 2001)
 "Music" (August 31, 2001)
 "Make Believe Stories" (September 4, 2001)
 "Real Stories" (September 5, 2001)
 "More Than One Way to Tell a Tale - Versions" (September 6, 2001)
 "More Than One Way to Tell a Tale - Techniques" (September 7, 2001)
 "Putting Heart Into Your Story" (September 10, 2001)
 "Collaboration" (September 11, 2001)

Cast
 Tomie dePaola - Himself

Puppeteers
 Bill Barretta - Pepe the King Prawn (episode 8), Strega Nona
 Steve Whitmire - Kermit the Frog (episode 25), Rizzo the Rat (episode 25)
 Julianne Buescher - Bambolona, guitar-playing weasel
 John Kennedy - Gabe the Squirrel, Big Anthony
 Greg Ballora -
 Alison Mork -
 James Murray - Goat, Right Hand of Bambolona

Other appearances
 The puppet for Gabe the Squirrel later appeared in Bear in the Big Blue House as Skippy the Squirrel.
 The puppets for Gabe the Squirrel and the Goat have been used in different Henson Alternative projects:
 The puppets for Gabe the Squirrel and the Goat later appeared in Puppet Up!.
 The puppet for the Goat later appeared in Simian Undercover Detective Squad episode "It's a Mad, Mad, Mad, Mad Goat" as Mad Goat.
 The puppets for Gabe the Squirrel and the Goat appear in Neil's Puppet Dreams.
 The puppets for Gabe the Squirrel and the Goat appear in No, You Shut Up!.

References

External links
 Telling Stores with Tomie dePaolo at Internet Movie Database
 Telling Stories with Tomie dePaola at Muppet Wiki

2000s American children's television series
2001 American television series debuts
2001 American television series endings
American television shows featuring puppetry
Television series about squirrels
Television series by The Jim Henson Company
Works by Tomie de Paola